NGC 494, also occasionally referred to as PGC 5035 or GC 282, is a barred spiral galaxy in the constellation Pisces. It is located approximately 227 million light-years from Earth and was discovered on 22 November 1827 by astronomer John Herschel. John Dreyer, creator of the New General Catalogue, described the galaxy as "very faint, pretty large, extended, 3 faint stars to south".

See also  
 Spiral galaxy 
 List of NGC objects (1–1000)
 Pisces (constellation)

References

External links 
 
 
 SEDS

Spiral galaxies
Pisces (constellation)
0494
5035
Astronomical objects discovered in 1827
Discoveries by John Herschel